Sah District is a district of the Hadhramaut Governorate, Yemen. In 2003, the district had a population of 24,146.

References

Districts of Hadhramaut Governorate